The Medal "For the Defence of Odessa" was a World War II campaign medal of the Soviet Union established on December 22, 1942 by decree of the Presidium of the Supreme Soviet of the USSR to reward the participants of the defence of the port city of Odessa from the Axis armed forces of Romania and Nazi Germany.  The medal's statute was amended on July 18, 1980 by decree of the Presidium of the Supreme Soviet of the USSR № 2523-X.

Medal statute 
The Medal "For the Defence of Odessa" was awarded to all participants in the defence of Odessa - soldiers of the Red Army, Navy and troops of the NKVD, as well as persons from the civilian population who took part in the defence of Odessa during its siege by German and Romanian forces.  

Award of the medal was made on behalf of the Presidium of the Supreme Soviet of the USSR on the basis of documents attesting to actual participation in the defence of Odessa issued by the unit commander, the chief of the military medical establishment or by a relevant provincial or municipal authority.  Serving military personnel received the medal from their unit commander, retirees from military service received the medal from a regional, municipal or district military commissioner in the recipient's community, members of the civilian population, participants in the defence of Odessa received their medal from regional or city Councils of People's Deputies.  Each medal came with an "attestation of award" certificate.  

The Medal "For the Defence of Odessa" was worn on the left side of the chest and in the presence of other awards of the USSR, was located immediately after the Medal "For the Defence of Moscow".  If worn in the presence of Orders or medals of the Russian Federation, the latter have precedence.

Medal description 
The Medal "For the Defence of Odessa" was a 32mm in diameter circular brass medal with a raised rim.  On the obverse in the background, the seashore and a distant lighthouse at right, in the center, the image of a red soldier and a red sailor marching towards the left their rifles at the ready; above the servicemen, the relief inscription "USSR".  A circular band following the medal's entire circumference bears the relief inscription "FOR THE DEFENCE OF ODESSA" at its top, at both ends of the inscription, relief five-pointed stars.  On the same band at bottom center, a five-pointed star over a ribbon superimposed over the crossing point of laurel and oak branches going up the band to the two five-pointed stars near the upper inscription.  On the reverse near the top, the relief image of the hammer and sickle, below the image, the relief inscription in three rows "FOR OUR SOVIET MOTHERLAND".  

The Medal "For the Defence of Odessa" was secured by a ring through the medal suspension loop to a standard Soviet pentagonal mount covered by a 24mm wide olive green silk moiré ribbon with a 2mm central light blue stripe.

Recipients (partial list)
The individuals below were all recipients of the Medal "For the Defence of Odessa".

Marshal of the Soviet Union Rodion Yakovlevich Malinovsky
Admiral of the Fleet Sergey Georgiyevich Gorshkov
Admiral Gordey Ivanovich Levchenko
Admiral Filipp Sergeyevich Oktyabrskiy
Army General Ivan Yefimovich Petrov
War correspondent Konstantin Mikhailovich Simonov
Marshal of the Soviet Union Vasily Ivanovich Petrov
Army General Ivan Vladimirovich Tyulenev
Admiral Lev Anatolevich Vladimirsky
Major Michael Petrovich Tsiselsky
Major Raul–Yuri Georgievich Ervier
Marshal of the Soviet Union Semyon Mikhailovich Budyonny
Marshal of the Soviet Union Vasily Ivanovich Petrov
Marshal of the Soviet Union Nikolay Ivanovich Krylov
Colonel Aleksej Vladimirovich Vysotsky
Colonel General Vasilii Vasil'evich Yermachenkov
War correspondent Boris Leont'evich Gorbatov
Major Alexandr Nikolaevich Mal'skii
Vice-admiral Aleksandr Sergeyevich Frolov
Captain of State Security Vladimir Aleksandrovich Molodtsov
Guards Junior Lieutenant Sergey Anfinogenovich Zudlov
Captain Lieutenant Grigorii Mikhailovich Pozhenyan
Junior Lieutenant Vladimir Izrailevich Peller
Partisan leader Yakov Yakovlevich Gordienko
Major Lyudmila Pavlichenko

See also 
Awards and decorations of the Soviet Union
Odessa
Hero City
Siege of Odessa

References

External links 
 Legal Library of the USSR

Soviet campaign medals
Military awards and decorations of the Soviet Union
1942 establishments in the Soviet Union
Awards established in 1942